Cyanopepla bella is a moth of the subfamily Arctiinae. It was described by Félix Édouard Guérin-Méneville in 1844. It is found in Mexico, Guatemala and Honduras.

References

Cyanopepla
Moths described in 1844